Line 16 of the Hangzhou Metro is a metro line running east–west from  in Yuhang District to  in Lin'an District. The line is colored light orange on system maps. The line began construction in early 2016 and opened on 23 April 2020.

Route overview
The line trains are powered by  cars and a 
overhead catenary. A comprehensive vehicle base is set up in Xiaquan Village, Lin'an District, and the control center is located in the control center of Hangzhou Metro. The project uses a 35kV decentralized power supply scheme.

History

Opening timeline

Stations

See also
 Hangzhou Metro

References

16
Standard gauge railways in China
Railway lines opened in 2020
2020 establishments in China